This a list of dams and reservoirs that are located in the Indian state of Tamil Nadu.

List of dams and reservoirs in Tamil Nadu

References 

D
D
D
T